In the post-production process of film editing and video editing, a dissolve (sometimes called a lap dissolve) is a type of film transition in which one sequence fades over another. The terms fade-out (also called fade to black) and fade-in are used to describe a transition to and from a blank image. This is in contrast to a cut, where there is no such transition. A dissolve overlaps two shots for the duration of the effect, usually at the end of one scene and the beginning of the next, but may be used in montage sequences also. Generally, but not always, the use of a dissolve is held to indicate that a period of time has passed between the two scenes. Also, it may indicate a change of location or the start of a flashback.

Creation of effect
In film, this effect is usually created with an optical printer by controlled double exposure from frame to frame. In linear video editing or a live television production, the same effect is created by interpolating voltages of the video signal. In non-linear video editing, a dissolve is done using software, by interpolating gradually between the RGB values of each pixel of the image. The audio track optionally cross-fades between the soundtracks.

Use
Cuts and dissolves are used differently. A camera cut changes the perspective from which a scene is portrayed. It is as if the viewer suddenly and instantly moved to a different place, and could see the scene from another angle.

Fades and dissolves typically have a duration of 1 to 2 seconds (24–48 frames), though this may vary according to the preference of the director and editor. Short dissolves (6–12 frames) may be used to soften obvious hard cuts which may startle the viewer, or jump cuts.

In narrative terms, the length of the dissolve is dictated by the mood or pacing the director or editor wishes to create. For instance, in the opening sequence of Citizen Kane, the dissolves between the master shots are slow because of the pervading sense of morbidity Welles and his collaborators wished to create. In the "News on the March" (montage) sequence shortly afterwards, however, the dissolves are much shorter as the intention is to create a sense of vitality in the life of the still mysterious lead character and speed in the (supposedly) newsreel sequence.

Dissolves are most common in classic cinema (see continuity editing), but are now less often used. The device began to fall into disuse as filmmakers fell under the influence of the French New Wave directors and their innovative use of the jump cut and as the absence of a linear narrative became more common. It is also sometimes held that the effect was best utilized in monochrome cinematography, where gradations of gray are mixed rather than possibly incompatible color tones. The impact of television news reporting may also have resulted in the device losing any pretense of having a contemporary feel.

Dissolves are usually kept to a minimum in most films and shows. Due mainly to stylistic tastes, it is very rare to see a shot which both begins and ends with a dissolve

See also
Sound transitions:
Crossfading 
Fade (audio engineering)
Offscreen
Wipe transition
Georges Méliès
Dissolve (Blend mode)

References

Articles containing video clips
Film editing
Cinematic techniques